Herens or Hérens may refer to:

 Val d'Hérens, a valley in Switzerland
 Hérens (district), an administrative district covering the above valley
 Herens (cattle), a breed of cattle originating from the above valley

See also
 Heren railway station, Taiwan